"River" is the 14th major single by the Japanese idol group AKB48, released on 21 October 2009. It was the first AKB48 single to top the Oricon weekly singles chart, having sold 179,000 copies in its first week. Thus it became the group's best selling single, beating "Namida Surprise!", which by then had sold 144,000 copies in 18 weeks.

Music video 
The music video was filmed at Iruma Air Base.

Release 
The bonuses for the first-press limited edition included a handshake event ticket for various locations (Sendai, Nagoya, Osaka, Hiroshima, Fukuoka, Sapporo, Tokyo), as well as a voting card for the AKB48 Request Hour Set List Best 100 2010. On the theater edition, the bonuses included a handshake event ticket (Tokyo Big Sight, SKE48 Theater), a special performance ticket lottery (live stage performances, karaoke competition, AKB meeting), and a random member photo.

Track listing

Members 
(Team affiliation at the time of the release.)

"River"
(Front members are in bold, Center:Atsuko Maeda)
 Team A:  Haruna Kojima, Mariko Shinoda, Minami Takahashi, Atsuko Maeda,
 Team K: Sayaka Akimoto, Yūko Ōshima, Erena Ono, Sae Miyazawa, Tomomi Itano, Minami Minegishi,
 Team B: Yuki Kashiwagi, Mayu Watanabe, Rie Kitahara, Miho Miyazaki, Tomomi Kasai
 SKE48 Team S: Jurina Matsui

"Kimi no Koto ga Suki Dakara" 
Performed by Under Girls:
(Front members are in bold, Center: Aki Takajō)
 Team A: Amina Satō, Aki Takajō, Reina Fujie
 Team K: Manami Oku, Asuka Kuramochi
 Team B: Aika Ōta, Haruka Katayama, Rino Sashihara, Haruka Nakagawa, Moeno Nitō
 Team Kenkyūsei：Haruka Ishida, Ayaka Kikuchi, Mika Komori, Sumire Satō, Ami Maeda
 SKE48 Team S: Rena Matsui

"Hikōkigumo" 
Theater Girls:
 Team A: Chisato Nakata
 Team K: Ayaka Umeda, Kana Kobayashi, Natsuki Satō, Rina Chikano, Yuka Masuda, Natsumi Matsubara
 Team B: Miku Tanabe, Tomomi Nakatsuka, Sayaka Nakaya, Natsumi Hirajima, Rumi Yonezawa
 Team Kenkyūsei: Misaki Iwasa, Mayumi Uchida, Shizuka Ōya, Mariya Suzuki, Misato Nonaka, Sakiko Matsui

Charts

JKT48 version 

"River" was the first single of the Indonesian idol group JKT48, released on 11 May 2013 under the label Hits Records. It has been performed by selected members from JKT48's Team J and JKT48 trainees. The single is JKT48's version of AKB48's song.

Track listing 
The single has two versions: Regular Edition (CD+DVD); and Theater Edition (CD only).

Regular edition 

Bonus
 Special Photo
 JKT48 Card Battle Game Digital Card

Theater edition 

Bonus
 JKT48 Trump Card
 Handshake ticket

Personnel

"River" 
Center: Melody Nurramdhani Laksani, Devi Kinal Putri
 Team J: Aki Takajo, Ayana Shahab, Beby Chaesara Anadila, Delima Rizky, Devi Kinal Putri, Gabriela Margareth Warouw, Haruka Nakagawa, Jessica Vania, Jessica Veranda, Melody Nurramdhani Laksani, Nabilah Ratna Ayu Azalia, Rena Nozawa, Rezky Wiranti Dhike, Rica Leyona, Shania Junianatha, Stella Cornelia

"Mirai no Kajitsu -Buah Masa Depan-" 
 Trainee: Alicia Chanzia, Annisa Athia, Cindy Yuvia, Della Della, Jennifer Hanna, Lidya Maulida Djuhandar, Natalia, Noella Sisterina, Octi Sevpin, Ratu Vienny Fitrilya, Riskha Fairunissa, Rona Anggreani, Shinta Naomi, Sinka Juliani, Thalia, Viviyona Apriani

"Sakura no Shiori -Pembatas Buku Sakura-" 
 Team J: Aki Takajo, Ayana Shahab, Beby Chaesara Anadila, Cindy Gulla, Delima Rizky, Devi Kinal Putri, Diasta Priswarini, Frieska Anastasia Laksani, Gabriela Margareth Warouw, Ghaida Farisya, Haruka Nakagawa, Jessica Vania, Jessica Veranda, Melody Nurramdhani Laksani, Nabilah Ratna Ayu Azalia, Rena Nozawa, Rezky Wiranti Dhike, Rica Leyona, Sendy Ariani, Shania Junianatha, Sonia Natalia, Sonya Pandawarman, Stella Cornelia
 Trainee: Alicia Chanzia, Annisa Athia, Cindy Yuvia, Della Delila, Dellia Erdita, Dena Siti Rohayati, Dwi Putri Bonita, Fakhiryani Shafariyanti, Intar Putri Kariina, Jennifer Hanna, Jennifer Rachel Natasya, Lidya Maulida Djuhandar, Nadhifa Karimah, Nadila Cindy Wantari, Natalia, Noella Sisterina, Novinta Dhini, Octi Sevpin, Priscilla Sari Dewi, Ratu Vienny Fitrilya, Riskha Fairunissa, Rona Anggreani, Saktia Oktapyani, Shinta Naomi, Sinka Juliani, Thalia, Thalia Ivanka Elizabeth, Viviyona Apriani

"Kimi ni Autabi Koi wo Suru -Jatuh Cinta Setiap Bertemu Denganmu-" 
 Team J: Aki Takajo, Ayana Shahab, Beby Chaesara Anadila, Cindy Gulla, Devi Kinal Putri, Gabriela Margareth Warouw, Ghaida Farisya, Haruka Nakagawa, Jessica Vania, Jessica Veranda, Melody Nurramdhani Laksani, Nabilah Ratna Ayu Azalia, Rena Nozawa, Rezky Wiranti Dhike, Sendy Ariani, Shania Junianatha

BNK48 version

The Thai idol group BNK48, a sister group of AKB48 in Thailand, covered the song with the same name. It is their first studio album including songs from previous singles, Aitakatta (อยากจะได้พบเธอ), Koi Suru Fortune Cookie (คุ๊กกี้เสี่ยงทาย), and Shonichi(วันแรก) released on August 04, 2018.

Track listing

Personnel
 Bold indicates centres.

River 
Team BIII: Cherprang Areekul, Isarapa Thawatpakdee (Tarwaan), Jennis Oprasert, Jiradapa Intajak (Pupe), Kanteera Wadcharathadsanakul (Noey), Kunjiranut Intarasin (Jane), Milin Dokthian (Namneung), Natruja Chutiwansopon (Kaew), Nayika Srinian (Can), Patchanan Jiajirachote (Orn), Pichayapa Natha (Namsai), Pimrapat Phadungwatanachok (Mobile), Praewa Suthamphong (Music), Punsikorn Tiyakorn (Pun), Vathusiri Phuwapunyasiri (Korn)
Trainee: Rinrada Inthaisong (Piam)

Aitakatta (อยากจะได้พบเธอ) and  Oogoe Diamond(ก็ชอบให้รู้ว่าชอบ) 
Trainee: Cherprang Areekul, Christin Larsen (Namhom), Isarapa Thawatpakdee (Tarwaan), Jennis Oprasert, Jetsupa Kruetang (Jan), Kanteera Wadcharathadsanakul (Noey), Milin Dokthian (Namneung), Miori Ohkubo, Napaphat Worraphuttanon (Jaa), Natruja Chutiwansopon (Kaew), Nayika Srinian (Can), Patchanan Jiajirachote (Orn), Praewa Suthamphong (Music), Punsikorn Tiyakorn (Pun), Sawitchaya Kajonrungsilp (Satchan), Warattaya Deesomlert (Kaimook)

365nichi no Kamihikouki (365วันกับเครื่องบินกระดาษ) 
Trainee: Cherprang Areekul, Christin Larsen (Namhom), Isarapa Thawatpakdee (Tarwaan), Jennis Oprasert, Jetsupa Kruetang (Jan), Kanteera Wadcharathadsanakul (Noey), Milin Dokthian (Namneung), Miori Ohkubo, Napaphat Worraphuttanon (Jaa), Natruja Chutiwansopon (Kaew), Nayika Srinian (Can), Patchanan Jiajirachote (Orn), Praewa Suthamphong (Music), Punsikorn Tiyakorn (Pun), Sawitchaya Kajonrungsilp (Satchan), Warattaya Deesomlert (Kaimook)

Koi Suru Fortune Cookie (คุ๊กกี้เสี่ยงทาย) 
Trainee: Cherprang Areekul, Isarapa Thawatpakdee (Tarwaan), Jennis Oprasert, Jetsupa Kruetang (Jan), Jiradapa Intajak (Pupe), Kanteera Wadcharathadsanakul (Noey), Milin Dokthian (Namneung), Miori Ohkubo, Natruja Chutiwansopon (Kaew), Patchanan Jiajirachote (Orn), Pimrapat Phadungwatanachok (Mobile), Praewa Suthamphong (Music), Punsikorn Tiyakorn (Pun), Sawitchaya Kajonrungsilp (Satchan), Warattaya Deesomlert (Kaimook)
Team Kaigai: Izuta Rina

BNK48 (Bangkok 48) 
Trainee: Cherprang Areekul, Isarapa Thawatpakdee (Tarwaan), Jennis Oprasert, Jetsupa Kruetang (Jan), Jiradapa Intajak (Pupe), Kanteera Wadcharathadsanakul (Noey), Milin Dokthian (Namneung), Miori Ohkubo, Natruja Chutiwansopon (Kaew), Patchanan Jiajirachote (Orn), Pimrapat Phadungwatanachok (Mobile), Praewa Suthamphong (Music), Punsikorn Tiyakorn (Pun), Sawitchaya Kajonrungsilp (Satchan), Warattaya Deesomlert (Kaimook)
Team Kaigai: Izuta Rina

Skirt, Hirari (พลิ้ว) 
Trainee: Korapat Nilprapa (Kate), Kunjiranut Intarasin (Jane), Mananya Kaoju (Nink), Napaphat Worraphuttanon (Jaa), Panisa Srilaloeng (Mind), Pichayapa Natha (Namsai), Suchaya Saenkhot (Jib)

Shonichi(วันแรก) 
 Team BIII: Cherprang Areekul, Isarapa Thawatpakdee (Tarwaan), Jennis Oprasert, Jiradapa Intajak (Pupe), Kanteera Wadcharathadsanakul (Noey), Kunjiranut Intarasin (Jane), Milin Dokthian (Namneung), Napaphat Worraphuttanon (Jaa), Natruja Chutiwansopon (Kaew), Patchanan Jiajirachote (Orn), Pimrapat Phadungwatanachok (Mobile), Praewa Suthamphong (Music), Punsikorn Tiyakorn (Pun), Sawitchaya Kajonrungsilp (Satchan), Vathusiri Phuwapunyasiri (Korn), Warattaya Deesomlert (Kaimook)

Sakura no Hanabiratachi (ความทรงจำและคำอำลา) 
 Team BIII: Cherprang Areekul, Isarapa Thawatpakdee (Tarwaan), Jennis Oprasert, Jiradapa Intajak (Pupe), Kanteera Wadcharathadsanakul (Noey), Kunjiranut Intarasin (Jane), Milin Dokthian (Namneung), Napaphat Worraphuttanon (Jaa), Natruja Chutiwansopon (Kaew), Patchanan Jiajirachote (Orn), Pimrapat Phadungwatanachok (Mobile), Praewa Suthamphong (Music), Punsikorn Tiyakorn (Pun), Sawitchaya Kajonrungsilp (Satchan), Vathusiri Phuwapunyasiri (Korn), Warattaya Deesomlert (Kaimook)

Namida Surprise! (ประกายน้ำตาและรอยยิ้ม!) 
Team BIII: Cherprang Areekul, Isarapa Thawatpakdee (Tarwaan), Jennis Oprasert, Kanteera Wadcharathadsanakul (Noey), Korapat Nilprapa (Kate), Miori Ohkubo, Nayika Srinian (Can), Patchanan Jiajirachote (Orn), Pichayapa Natha (Namsai), Pimrapat Phadungwatanachok (Mobile), Praewa Suthamphong (Music), Punsikorn Tiyakorn (Pun), Rina Izuta, Vathusiri Phuwapunyasiri (Korn)
Trainee: Mananya Kaoju (Nink), Rinrada Inthaisong (Piam)

Anata to Christmas Eve (คำสัญญาแห่งคริสต์มาสอีฟ) 
Team BIII: Jetsupa Kruetang (Jan), Natruja Chutiwansopon (Kaew)

MNL48 version

The Filipino idol group MNL48, a sister group of AKB48, covered the song with the same title. It is their sixth single released on November 27, 2020. This single includes the voting ballots for MNL48 3rd General Election.

Tracklisting

 Bold indicates centers.

Other versions
 The song was redone in Mandarin by the Chinese idol group SNH48 and was included on their first single, "Heavy Rotation".
 The Vietnamese idol group SGO48 will release it this year 2020 as 3rd single, the Senbatsu members are chosen from "Senbatsu Battle"

References

External links 
 AKB48の通算14枚目のシングル「RIVER」　AKB48の新曲がデイリー・シングルランキング初登場1位 (2009-10-22)
 King Records profile
 AKB48「AKB48も楽曲も進化する！！新たなスタートへ」-ORICON STYLE ミュージック Oricon
 JKT48 Discography 
 River Special page 

JKT48 songs
2013 debut singles
2009 singles
Oricon Weekly number-one singles
Songs about rivers
Songs with lyrics by Yasushi Akimoto
AKB48 songs
King Records (Japan) singles
2009 songs
BNK48 songs
MNL48 songs